Microchirus is a genus of soles native to the Eastern Atlantic Ocean and Mediterranean Sea.

Species
There are currently seven recognized species in this genus:
 Microchirus azevia (Brito Capello, 1867) (Bastard sole)
 Microchirus boscanion (Chabanaud, 1926) (Lusitanian sole)
 Microchirus frechkopi Chabanaud, 1952 (Frechkop's sole)
 Microchirus ocellatus (Linnaeus, 1758) (Foureyed sole)
 Microchirus theophila (A. Risso, 1810)
 Microchirus variegatus (Donovan, 1808) (Thickback sole)
 Microchirus wittei Chabanaud, 1950 (Banded sole)

References

Soleidae
Marine fish genera
Taxa named by Charles Lucien Bonaparte